The 1883–84 season was the 13th season of competitive football in England.

Overview
1883–1884 saw the world's first international tournament begin. The British Home Championship pitted the UK's four national teams (England, Scotland, Wales and Ireland) against each other in a league competition in which each played the other three once. Scotland won the first contest with England finishing second.

National team

* England score given first

Key
 A = Away match
 BHC = British Home Championship

Honours

Notes = Number in parentheses is the times that club has won that honour. * indicates new record for competition

Events

 5 February 1884 – Derby County Football Club is founded
 Black Arabs F.C. season 1883–84 (inaugural season of today's Bristol Rovers F.C.)
 Everton moves as tenant to Anfield, a newly enclosed ground off Anfield Road, Liverpool.
 Leicester City founded as Leicester Fosse.

References

External links

Report on Wales v England match on thefa.com